Alan Harold Luther (born December 14, 1940) is an American physicist, specializing in condensed matter physics.

Education and career
Luther graduated in electrical engineering from Massachusetts Institute of Technology (MIT) with a B.S. in 1962 and an M.S. in 1963. In 1967 he graduated from the University of Maryland with a Ph.D. in physics under the supervision of Richard Allan Ferrell. As a postdoc Luther was from 1967 to 1969 at the Technical University of Munich and from 1969 to 1971 at Brookhaven National Laboratory. At Harvard University he was from 1971 to 1973 an assistant professor and from 1973 to 1976 an associate professor. At Nordita in Copenhagen he was from 1976 a full professor from 1976 until his retirement as professor emeritus.

In 1974 he found, with Victor Emery, exact solutions for one-dimensional electron gas models (Luther-Emery liquids). Luther's research also deals with boson-fermion duality, conformal field theories, the generalized Bethe ansatz, spin chains and two-dimensional models of statistical mechanics, strongly correlated electron systems in two dimensions, and high-temperature superconductivity.

For the academic year 1975–1976 he was a Sloan Research Fellow. In 2001 he received (with Victor Emery) the Oliver E. Buckley Condensed Matter Prize for "fundamental contribution to the theory of interacting electrons in one dimension."

Selected publications

Books

References

1940 births
Living people
20th-century American physicists
21st-century American physicists
Theoretical physicists
Condensed matter physicists
Massachusetts Institute of Technology alumni
University System of Maryland alumni
Harvard University faculty
Oliver E. Buckley Condensed Matter Prize winners